Astragalus monoensis is a rare species of milkvetch known by the common name Mono milkvetch. It is endemic to the open pumice plains of central Mono County, California.

Description
Astragalus monoensis is a rhizomatous perennial herb with stems growing partly underground and emerging to lie flat on the sand. Stem and leaflets are hairy.

The inflorescence is a cluster of 6 to 12 very pale pink to yellowish flowers, each around a centimeter long. The fruit is a legume pod, curved to bent in shape and drying to a papery, hairy texture.

References

External links
Jepson Manual Treatment — Astragalus monoensis
USDA Plants Profile
BLM Profile
Astragalus monoensis — U.C. Photo gallery

monoensis
Flora of the California desert regions
Endemic flora of California
Natural history of Mono County, California